Akhund Mullah Mohammad Kashani 19th century mystic, philosopher, sage, Shiite scholar. Teacher of philosophy and mysticism.

Life 
Akhund Mullah Mohammad Kashani, known as lunar tiles in 1834 was born in Kashan. In place of his birth date and age of his birth is not mentioned during the 84 years of his life, to guess. According to Syed Jalaluddin Homai, he, along with Jahangir Khan Qashqai as two distinguished professors in philosophy and jurisprudence, literature and jurisprudence have. He taught for fifty years and foster outstanding students in the fields of intellectual and traditional sciences. He died on 3 July 1915 in Isfahan and was buried in Takht-e Foulad.

References 

Iranian Shia clerics